Gaj or GAJ may refer to:

Places

Croatia 

Gaj, Požega-Slavonia County, a village near Lipik
Gaj, Zagreb County, a village near Vrbovec

Bosnia and Herzegovina 

Gaj (Goražde)
Gaj (Gornji Vakuf)
Gaj (Kiseljak)
Gaj (Nevesinje)
Gaj (Srebrenica)

Poland 

Gaj, Golub-Dobrzyń County in Kuyavian-Pomeranian Voivodeship (north-central Poland)
Gaj, Mogilno County in Kuyavian-Pomeranian Voivodeship (north-central Poland)
Gaj, Łęczyca County in Łódź Voivodeship (central Poland)
Gaj, Łowicz County in Łódź Voivodeship (central Poland)
Gaj, Brzeziny County in Łódź Voivodeship (central Poland)
Gaj, Radomsko County in Łódź Voivodeship (central Poland)
Gaj, Rawa County in Łódź Voivodeship (central Poland)
Gaj, Tomaszów Mazowiecki County in Łódź Voivodeship (central Poland)
Gaj, Bielsk County in Podlaskie Voivodeship (north-east Poland)
Gaj, Przysucha County in Masovian Voivodeship (east-central Poland)
Gaj, Pułtusk County in Masovian Voivodeship (east-central Poland)
Gaj, Sochaczew County in Masovian Voivodeship (east-central Poland)
Gaj, Wyszków County in Masovian Voivodeship (east-central Poland)
Gaj, Gniezno County in Greater Poland Voivodeship (west-central Poland)
Gaj, Gostyń County in Greater Poland Voivodeship (west-central Poland)
Gaj, Koło County in Greater Poland Voivodeship (west-central Poland)
Gaj, Konin County in Greater Poland Voivodeship (west-central Poland)
Gaj, Śrem County in Greater Poland Voivodeship (west-central Poland)
Gaj, Lubusz Voivodeship (west Poland)
Gaj, Pomeranian Voivodeship (north Poland)
Gaj, Bartoszyce County in Warmian-Masurian Voivodeship (north Poland)
Gaj, Nowe Miasto County in Warmian-Masurian Voivodeship (north Poland)
Gaj, Gmina Barczewo in Warmian-Masurian Voivodeship (north Poland)
Gaj, Gmina Olsztynek in Warmian-Masurian Voivodeship (north Poland)

Serbia 

Gaj, Belgrade, a suburban neighborhood of Belgrade in the Municipality of Voždovac 
Gaj (Barajevo), a suburban neighborhood of Belgrade in the Municipality of Barajevo
Gaj (Kovin), a village near Kovin
 Veliki Gaj, a village in Plandište municipality (Vojvodina)

Slovenia 

Gaj, Brežice
Gaj, Slovenska Bistrica
Gaj, Šmarje pri Jelšah

People 
 Surname
 Ljudevit Gaj (1809-1872), Croatian linguist, politician, journalist and writer, inventor of Gaj's Latin alphabet
 Given name
 Gaj Singh (born 1948), Indian politician
 Gaj Singh of Marwar (1595-1638), Raja of Marwar Kingdom (in modern India)

 Other names
Gary Ablett Jr., Australian footballer known by the nickname "GAJ"

Other uses 
 Gadsup language
 Gaj language
 Guz, a unit of length used in parts of Asia
 INS Gaj (2002), a tugboat of the Indian Navy
 Yamagata Airport, in Japan

See also